Barnabò is a surname. Notable people with the surname include:

Guglielmo Barnabò (1888–1954), Italian actor 
Alessandro Barnabò (1801–1874), Italian catholic cardinal